Fox River Mills, Inc., is a sock manufacturer based in Osage, Iowa.

The company was founded in 1900. In 1992, they purchased the Nelson Knitting Company of Rockford, Illinois, and in the process acquired the trademark on the Red Heel socks used to make sock monkeys. Fox River Mills includes instructions for making a sock monkey in every packet of Red Heel socks.

Fox River Mills is also known for their odor-controlling X-Static sock liners and their line of organic wool socks.

See also

List of sock manufacturers

References

External links
Home Page
Beer Socks

Clothing companies of the United States
Companies based in Iowa
Clothing companies established in 1900
Hosiery brands
Socks
1900 establishments in Iowa
Osage, Iowa